Goeppert-Mayer is a crater on the planet Venus. West of the crater the scarp has more than one kilometer (0.6 miles) of relief.

References

Impact craters on Venus